José Francisco Fuentes Esperón (c. 1966 – September 6, 2009) was a Mexican politician. At the time of his death he was a candidate for the Tabasco state legislature with the Institutional Revolutionary Party (PRI) who lived in the state capital Villahermosa. He was also a former rector of the Universidad Tecnológica de Tabasco.

On September 6, 2009, Fuentes was shot dead by home invaders at his home in the state capital, Villahermosa. His body, along with those of his wife and two sons, were found inside their home in Villahermosa by relatives.

References
Mexican Police Make Arrest in Killing of Candidate and His Family New York Times

2009 deaths
Institutional Revolutionary Party politicians
Assassinated Mexican politicians
People murdered in Mexico
Deaths by firearm in Mexico
Year of birth uncertain
Family murders
Heads of universities and colleges in Mexico
Politicians killed in the Mexican Drug War